Pili bifurcati is characterized by bifurcation found in short segments along the shafts of several hairs, with each branch of the bifurcation being covered with its own cuticle.

See also 
 List of cutaneous conditions
 Pili multigemini – multiple hairs growing from the same source.
 Ringed hair

References

External links 

Conditions of the skin appendages